Sugar Ray Leonard vs. Terry Norris was a professional boxing match contested on February 9, 1991, for the WBC super welterweight title.

Background
After winning the WBC super middleweight in December 1988, "Sugar" Ray Leonard successfully defended the title twice in 1989 against two of his biggest rivals, first fighting Thomas Hearns to a draw in June and then defeating Roberto Durán by unanimous decision in December. A month after the Durán fight, Leonard vacated the WBC super middleweight title as the WBC was pressuring Leonard to make another defense and Leonard was unsure when he would fight again. Leonard pursued a rematch with Marvin Hagler, but Hagler refused and opted to remain retired stating "A while ago, yeah, I wanted him so bad, but I'm over that." Leonard was also in talks for a third fight with Hearns, but Hearns, who was then fighting as a light heavyweight, would not agree to the 162 pound catch-weight Leonard wanted, insisting he could no longer make that weight. Leonard would ultimately not fight at all in 1990, but by year's end Leonard would reach an agreement to fight WBC super welterweight (AKA light middleweight) champion Terry Norris. Though Norris was both the champion and 11 years younger than Leonard, and despite Leonard's inactivity, Leonard was a 12-to-5 favorite going into the fight.

Leonard's lawyer and adviser Mike Trainer agreed to broadcast the fight on Showtime. Executives from Showtime's rival network HBO, which had employed Leonard as a broadcaster since 1978, decided to release Leonard from his broadcasting contract after not being given the opportunity to bid on the rights to air the fight. HBO sports head Seth Abraham stated "If HBO is not offered the opportunity to bid on the fight, then it's inappropriate for Ray to continue as an HBO broadcaster."

The fight
The fight was a one-sided affair as Norris dominated Leonard en route to a unanimous decision victory. Norris would score two knockdowns over Leonard, the first occurred during the last 10 seconds of the second round after Norris countered a Leonard combination with a left hand. As Leonard was down, Norris would run forward and land another right hand for which referee Arthur Mercante Jr. warned Norris after the round that he would be disqualified should he commit a foul like that again. Norris sent Leonard down again late in the seventh round with a short right hand. Norris would go on the attack in an effort to finish the fight, but a dazed Leonard was able to survive the round. Norris would control the remainder of the fight though Leonard would make it through the 12th and final round. All three judges had Norris the victor with scores of 120–104, 119–103 and 116–110. Once the scorecards were read, Leonard announced to the crowd that the fight would be his last, but he returned for one more fight in 1997.

Fight card

References

1990s in Manhattan
1991 in boxing
1991 in sports in New York City
Boxing on Showtime
Boxing matches at Madison Square Garden
Boxing matches involving Sugar Ray Leonard
February 1991 sports events in the United States